Erkki Sakari Tuomioja (born 1 July 1946) is a Finnish politician and a member of the Finnish Parliament. From 2000 to 2007 and 2011 to 2015, he served as the minister for foreign affairs. He was president of the Nordic Council in 2008.

Tuomioja is a member of the Social Democratic Party of Finland, although his political views are thought to be more to the left than the party line. He is also a member of ATTAC. In 1975, Tuomioja dated Tarja Halonen who later became the president of Finland.

Biography

Tuomioja comes from a family of politicians. His father Sakari Tuomioja was a prominent liberal Finnish politician and diplomat, and the challenger of Urho Kekkonen for the conservatives and liberals in the 1956 presidential elections. His maternal grandmother was Hella Wuolijoki, the Estonian born writer and socialist activist.

Tuomioja holds the degrees of Master of Social Sciences (1971) and Master of Science in Economics and Business Administration (1974) from the Helsinki School of Economics, as well as Licentiate in Social Sciences (1980) and Doctor in Social Sciences (1996) from the University of Helsinki. In addition to Finnish, Tuomioja speaks Swedish, English, French, German and Estonian.

Tuomioja has been a member of the Finnish Parliament 1970–1979 and 1991–present. He held the position of minister of trade and industry in Lipponen's 2nd government, and became the minister of foreign affairs after Tarja Halonen was elected as president of Finland. Tuomioja is the longest serving minister for foreign affairs of Finland.

Tuomioja, like several other Finnish socialist politicians of today, took part in the illegal occupation of the Old Student House (Vanha ylioppilastalo) in Helsinki on 25 November 1968. He was a member of the anti-war group Committee of 100 of Finland and took part in the so-called Erik Schüller case, in which a group of students made public incitement against obligatory conscription. Despite his anti-war stance, Tuomioja did carry out his own mandatory military service and is a reservist staff sergeant.

Tuomioja is the author of several books. His A Delicate Shade of Pink about his grandmother Hella Wuolijoki and her sister Salme Murrik won the Non-Fiction Finlandia Prize in 2006. The book was originally written in English and translated to Finnish as Häivähdys punaista. In the 1970s and 1980s he was the editor-in-chief of Ydin, a foreign policy and political magazine.

Tuomioja was behind the initiative to establish Historians without Borders in Finland as an NGO. He has acted as Chairman of the Board of HWB Finland since the founding meeting in the summer of 2015. Tuomioja is a declared atheist.

European Union presidency 
When Finland held the rotating European Union presidency in the second half of 2006, Tuomioja had a prominent role as the spokesman of European Union foreign policy. He was among the first to demand an immediate cessation of hostilities in the 2006 Israel–Lebanon conflict. He was one of Finland's most dominant politicians in the 1990s.

See also 
 Israel–Finland relations

References

External links 

 Official website (partly in English) at the Finnish parliament
 Personal website
 Finland's EU Presidency
 Video interviews with Erkki Tuomioja
 Speeches and Articles by Dr. Erkki Tuomioja
 Dr. Erkki Tuomioja – The Role of Soft Power in EU Common Foreign Policy

|-

1946 births
Living people
Politicians from Helsinki
Finnish people of Estonian descent
Social Democratic Party of Finland politicians
Ministers for Foreign Affairs of Finland
Ministers of Trade and Industry of Finland
Members of the Parliament of Finland (1970–72)
Members of the Parliament of Finland (1972–75)
Members of the Parliament of Finland (1975–79)
Members of the Parliament of Finland (1991–95)
Members of the Parliament of Finland (1995–99)
Members of the Parliament of Finland (1999–2003)
Members of the Parliament of Finland (2003–07)
Members of the Parliament of Finland (2007–11)
Members of the Parliament of Finland (2011–15)
Members of the Parliament of Finland (2015–19)
Members of the Parliament of Finland (2019–23)
Children of national leaders
20th-century Finnish historians
Finnish bloggers
Tieto-Finlandia Award winners